Dębosznica is a river of Poland.  At Głowaczewo, Kołobrzeg County, the Dębosznica is split by a weir into two strands:  the left (southern) becomes a stream called the Łużanka, and the other merges into the Błotnica.  Within three kilometers both flow into the Lake Resko Przymorskie.

Rivers of Poland
Rivers of West Pomeranian Voivodeship
1Dębosznica